The spider species Araneus diadematus is commonly called the European garden spider, diadem spider, orangie, cross spider, and crowned orb weaver. It is sometimes called the pumpkin spider, although this name is also used for a different species, Araneus marmoreus. It is an orb-weaver spider found in Europe, where it is native, and North America, where it is introduced.

Range
A. diadematus has a holarctic distribution throughout Europe and across North America, from southern Canada to Mexico, and from British Columbia to Newfoundland.

Size and markings

Individual spiders' colourings can range from extremely light yellow to very dark grey, but all A. diadematus spiders have mottled white markings across the dorsal abdomen, with four or more segments forming a cross. The markings are formed in cells filled with guanine, which is a byproduct of protein metabolism.

Occasionally, the female will eat the male directly after mating. (See video below.)

Specialization

The legs of orb-weaver spiders are specialized for spinning orb webs. The webs are built by the larger females, which hang head down in the center of the web or remain hidden in nearby foliage, with one claw hooked to a signal line connected to the main orb, waiting for a disturbance to signal the arrival of prey. Prey is then quickly bitten and wrapped in silk to be stored for later consumption. The initial bite serves to paralyze the prey and minimize the danger of the spider herself being stung or bitten, and the enzymes thus injected serve to begin liquefaction of the prey's internal structures.

Alongside the use of the web to capture other prey, the spiders are also cannibals and prey on each other, but this only happens just before, during, or just after sexual activity. They attack based on their size, sexual experience, and hunger levels.

A. diadematus is a reclusive creature and only bites humans if cornered or otherwise provoked. It responds to a disturbance by vibrating rapidly in its web until it becomes a blur, a reaction that is assumed to confuse potential predators.

Gallery

References

External links
European orb-weavers
 

Araneus
Spiders described in 1758
Articles containing video clips
Holarctic spiders
Taxa named by Carl Alexander Clerck